Bob Saunders is an American football coach who is the offensive coordinator and running backs coach for the Memphis Showboats (2022) of the United States Football League (USFL). Saunders has served as an Offensive Assistant for the Kansas City Chiefs, Washington Redskins, St. Louis Rams, and Cleveland Browns. He served two seasons as wide receivers coach in the United Football League with the Virginia Destroyers. In college football, he was Offensive Coordinator and quarterbacks coach at Kansas Wesleyan University and at Oberlin College as well as the quarterbacks coach at Washington University in St. Louis. Saunders has been selected as receivers coach for the NFLPA Collegiate Bowl on three occasions.  Saunders played collegiate football at Southern Methodist University. He is the son of longtime NFL offensive coordinator and wide receivers coach Al Saunders, whom he worked with in Cleveland. He also served as the wide receivers coach for the DC Defenders of the defunct XFL.

References

External links
Official Redskins website biography of Bob Saunders

Year of birth missing (living people)
Living people
Kansas City Chiefs coaches
Washington Redskins coaches
Cleveland Browns coaches
Los Angeles Rams coaches
Virginia Destroyers coaches
DC Defenders coaches
Tampa Bay Bandits (2022) coaches
Kansas Wesleyan Coyotes football coaches
Washington University Bears football coaches
Oberlin Yeomen football coaches
SMU Mustangs football players